PKI dan Perwakilan ('PKI and the Representative Councils') was a quarterly journal published from Djakarta by the Communist Party of Indonesia (PKI) 1956–1964. The publication was initially known as PKI dan DPR and was founded in June 1956. The name was changed to PKI dan Perwakilan after the local council elections of 1957. The magazine sought to provide information about the activities of the party inside parliament and local councils.

As of 1960, the price of a copy of PKI dan Perwakilan was six rupiah.

References

Communist magazines
Communist Party of Indonesia
Defunct magazines published in Indonesia
Defunct political magazines
Magazines established in 1956
Magazines disestablished in 1964
Mass media in Jakarta
Political magazines published in Indonesia